Lymington Pier railway station serves the harbour area of Lymington in Hampshire, England. It has one platform.

Facilities
The station is unstaffed but has a self-service ticket machine for ticket purchases. There are no toilets at the station although there are toilets available at the nearby Wightlink ferry terminal. The station has a number of passenger shelters as well as information screens and modern help points located on the platform which has step-free access available to it.

Services

All services at Lymington Pier are operated by South Western Railway using Class 450 EMUs.

The typical off-peak service in trains per hour is:
 2 tph to 

Until 22 May 2010, the Lymington Branch Line was operated as a "heritage" service using restored Class 421 4Cig trains.

References

External Links

 

Buildings and structures in Lymington
Railway stations in Hampshire
DfT Category F1 stations
Former London and South Western Railway stations
Railway stations in Great Britain opened in 1884
Railway stations served by South Western Railway
Railway stations serving harbours and ports in the United Kingdom